Mississippi's 3rd congressional district (MS-3) covers central portions of state and stretches from the Louisiana border in the west to the Alabama border in the east.

Large cities in the district include Meridian, Starkville, Pearl, and Natchez. It also includes most of the wealthier portions of Jackson, including the portion of the city located in Rankin County. The district includes Mississippi State University in Starkville.

From statehood to the election of 1846, Mississippi elected representatives at-large statewide on a general ticket. This district has been redefined based on changes in statewide population.

Its current representative is Republican Michael Guest.

Election results from presidential races

List of members representing the district

Recent election results

2012

2014

2016

2018

2020

2022

Historical district boundaries

See also

Mississippi's congressional districts
List of United States congressional districts

References

 Congressional Biographical Directory of the United States 1774–present

03